The piratic flycatcher (Legatus leucophaius) is a passerine bird, the only member of the genus Legatus. It is a resident breeder from southern Mexico and Trinidad south to Bolivia and Argentina. At least some birds from Central America and Trinidad are migratory, and this species also visits Tobago.

This tyrant flycatcher is found in savannah and other semi-open habitat with large trees. It gets its name because it does not build its own nest, but appropriates the domed or enclosed nests of other, often far larger, bird species, such as yellow-rumped cacique or crested oropendola. Once the persistence of the flycatchers has driven the rightful owners away, their eggs are removed, and the female flycatcher lays up to four, but usually two, black-streaked brown eggs. She incubates these on her own for 16 days to hatching, with a further 18–20 days to fledging.

Description 
The adult piratic flycatcher is 15 cm long and weighs 23 g. The upperparts are unstreaked plain brown, although the flight feathers have narrow white edges. The head has a long whitish supercilium, a concealed yellow crown stripe, and a dusky mask through the eyes. The throat is white, and there is a white malar stripe.  The underparts are whitish with touches of light yellow, besides blurred brownish streaking on the breast and flanks. The dark bill is short and broad.

The call is an upslurred weeEEE given from a high perch for long periods of the day, or sometimes a monotonous  weep weep weep.

Piratic flycatchers wait on an exposed perch high in a tree, occasionally sallying out to feed on fruit (such as berries), their staple diet, as well as the catkins of Cecropia and insects (such as dragonflies). The young are fed on insects.

References

Further reading

piratic flycatcher
Birds of Central America
Birds of South America
Birds of Trinidad and Tobago
piratic flycatcher
piratic flycatcher